Eduardo Belza Franco (born 5 September 1956) is a Uruguayan retired footballer who played as a goalkeeper.

Football career
Born in Montevideo, Belza began his professional career with Spain's Atlético Madrid, playing three La Liga matches in the 1980–81 season. He spent the next three years appearing with their reserves in the Segunda División and, after that, he played the next two campaigns back in South America, for Paraguay's Cerro Porteño and Club Nacional de Football in his homeland.

In 1986, Belza returned to Spain, starting the season at second-tier club Rayo Vallecano and concluding it in the service of RCD Mallorca in the top flight. He was mostly back-up to the Moroccan Zaki in the following campaign, which ended with relegation, and concluded his career with CD Tenerife – playing regularly as they gained promotion to the top division in his first season– and UD Las Palmas, subsequently retiring at the age of 35.

Whilst at the service of Las Palmas, Belza was sent off for the first and only time in his professional career on 5 April 1992, early into an eventual 0–3 second level away loss against Racing de Santander.

Post-retirement
On 3 February 2007, Belza was named as sporting director of the Uruguayan Football Association.

References

External links

Living people
1956 births
Footballers from Montevideo
Uruguayan footballers
Association football goalkeepers
La Liga players
Segunda División players
Atlético Madrid footballers
Atlético Madrid B players
Rayo Vallecano players
RCD Mallorca players
CD Tenerife players
UD Las Palmas players
Cerro Porteño players
Uruguayan Primera División players
Club Nacional de Football players
Uruguayan expatriate footballers
Expatriate footballers in Spain
Expatriate footballers in Paraguay
Uruguayan expatriate sportspeople in Spain
Uruguayan expatriate sportspeople in Paraguay